The 453d Electronic Warfare Squadron is a United States Air Force unit.  It is assigned to the 850th Spectrum Warfare Group and is stationed at Lackland Air Force Base, Texas.

Mission

The 453d provides electronic warfare (EW) support to Department of Defense and coalition warfighters. It provides EW support through four flights, operating to provide  radio frequency (RF) and other EW analyses and create a realistic training environment for the warfighter. Its products and services are utilized in a variety of areas, including mission planning, training, and exercises.

 The Flagging Analysis flight provides tactical comparison of current expectations to current reality to prepare warfighters to deploy and operate. It monitors worldwide threat environment to detect and identify of new or changed threat radars that may impact the performance of aircraft EW systems.
 The Operations flight analyses active and passive RF-based Sensor, EW & Command, Control & Communications and Intelligence Surveillance & Reconnaissance systems' performance in support of operational, acquisition, and training activities. Its Improved Many-on-Many (IMOM) family of analysis tools support mission planners with comprehensive EW & Command, Control & Communications and Intelligence Surveillance & Reconnaissance analyses, including radar detection, threat engagement, communications & jamming, Intelligence Surveillance & Reconnaissance collection, psychological operations broadcast, and passive detection capabilities.  Additionally, the flight provides computer-based EW target sets and various other modeling and simulation-based training scenarios.
 In 2015, The squadron's Data flight became a part of the 57th Intelligence Squadron.  It developed and maintained the Combat Support Database, Blue Airborne Target Signatures Database, US Electromagnetic Systems Database, Commercial Emitter Database, and the Next-Generation Electronic Warfare Integrated Reprogramming Database.

In June 2016, elements of the 68th Electronic Warfare Squadron became Detachment 1 of the squadron.

History

World War II

Organization and training in the United States
The squadron was first activated as the 453d Bombardment Squadron at Columbia Army Air Base, South Carolina on 4 August 1942 as one of the four original squadrons of the 323d Bombardment Group. The air echelon of the squadron had moved to Baer Field, Indiana in February. At Baer, it received new B-26Cs, then proceeded to the United Kingdom via the south Atlantic ferry route by June.

Combat in Europe

The squadron began operations with Eighth Air Force in July 1943 as part of the first raid on the European continent by B-26s.  When Ninth Air Force moved to the United Kingdom in the fall of 1943, the squadron became part of it.  It attacked airports, industrial factories, marshalling yards and military targets in France and the Low Countries.  During Big Week the squadron attacked Leeuwarden and Venlo Airfields.  The squadron also attacked V-weapons launch sites in France.

In preparation for Operation Overlord, the Invasion of Normandy, the 453d attacked coastal defenses and other targets in northwestern France.  on D-Day it attacked lines of communication and fortifications on the coast.  It was part of the aerial barrage during the opening stage of Operation Cobra, the breakout at Saint Lo.

In late August 1944, the squadron left England for Lessay Airfield, an advanced landing ground in France.  From the continent, it began flying night missions, with its first night mission against batteries near Saint-Malo.  It also carried out night missions against ammunition dumps and fuel storage areas.  In September, it attacked fortifications near Brest, France, and as allied forces advanced across France, toward the Siegfried Line shifted its operations primarily to targets in eastern France.  The squadron was awarded a Distinguished Unit Citation for striking transportation hubs used by the Wehrmacht to bring reinforcements to the Ardennes during the Battle of the Bulge.

The 453d flew interdiction missions in the Ruhr as the Allies drove across Germany and attacked enemy communications.  It flew its last combat in April 1945, then moved to Kempten, Germany, where it participated in the program to disarm Germany.  It returned to the United States in November and was inactivated at Camp Myles Standish, Massachusetts, the port of embarkation, a day later.

Air Force Reserve
The squadron was reactivated under Continental Air Command (ConAC) as a reserve unit at Tinker Air Force Base in June 1949, when ConAC reorganized its reserve units under the wing base organization system.  At Tinker, it trained under the supervision of ConAC's 2592d Air Force Reserve Training Center.   The squadron flew a mix of trainers and Douglas A-26 Invaders.  The unit was manned at only 25% of its normal strength.  All reserve combat units were mobilized for the Korean war. The squadron was mobilized on 10 March 1951.  Its personnel and aircraft were used as fillers for other organizations ond the squadron was inactivated a week later.

Flying training

Reformed as the 453d Flying Training Squadron at Mather Air Force Base California in 1973.  As part of the 323d Flying Training Wing, the 453d provided  electronic warfare officer (EWO) training to newly-winged or transitioning USAF navigators destined for EWO assignments in the Boeing B-52 Stratofortress, Rockwell B-1 Lancer, General Dynamics EF-111 Raven, Republic F-105D Wild Weasel, McDonnell F-4G Wild Weasel IV and V, Boeing RC-135W Rivet Joint, Boeing RC-135S Cobra Ball and Boeing RC-135U Combat Sent, Lockheed AC-130 Spectre, Lockheed MC-130 Combat Talon and Combat Shadow;  Lockheed EC-130E Airborne Battle Command & Control Center and Lockheed EC-130H Compass Call, or other selected USAF aircraft from 1973–1993.

Current role

The 453 Electronic Warfare Squadron is the fusion of the core EW functions from the original AF Electronic Warfare Center.  It was formed from the AF Special Communications Center of Excellence's EW Effectiveness Analysis Mission (Comfy Coat).

Lineage
 Constituted as the 453d Bombardment Squadron (Medium) on 19 June 1942
 Activated on 4 August 1942
 Redesignated 453d Bombardment Squadron, Medium c. 9 October 1944
 Inactivated on 14 December 1945
 Redesignated 453d Bombardment Squadron, Light on 10 May 1949
 Activated in the reserve on 27 June 1949
 Ordered to active service on 10 March 1951
 Inactivated on 17 March 1951
 Redesignated 453d Fighter-Bomber Squadron on 9 May 1955
 Activated on 8 August 1955
 Inactivated on 1 September 1957
 Redesignated 453d Flying Training Squadron c. 28 July 1972
 Activated on 1 April 1973
 Inactivated on 31 May 1993
 Redesignated 453d Electronic Warfare Squadron
 Activated c. 2000

Assignments
 323d Bombardment Group, 4 August 1942 – 12 December 1945
 323d Bombardment Group, 27 June 1949 – 17 March 1951
 323d Fighter-Bomber Group, 8 August 1955 – 1 September 1957
 323rd Flying Training Wing, 1 April 1973 – 15 December 1991
 323d Operations Group, 15 December 1991 – 31 May 1993
 318th Information Operations Group, c. May 2000 – 5 August 2009
 53d Electronic Warfare Group, 5 Aug 2009
 850th Spectrum Warfare Group 25 June 2021 – present

Stations

 Columbia Army Air Base, South Carolina, 4 August 1942
 MacDill Field, Florida 21 August 1942
 Myrtle Beach Bombing Range, South Carolina 2 November 1942 – 25 April 1943
 RAF Earls Colne, England (Station 358), 14 June 1943
 RAF Beaulieu, England (Station 408), 21 July 1944
 Lessay (A-20), France, 26 August 1944
 Chartres, France (Station 190, A-40), 21 September 1944
 Laon-Athies Airfield (A-69), France 13 October 1944
 Denain-Prouvy Airfield (A-83), France, 9 February 1945

 Augsburg, Germany (R-84), 15 May 1945
 Haunstetten, Germany, 12 July 1945
 Clastres, France (A-71), c. 1 October 1945
 Camp Myles Standish, Massachusetts, 13 December 1945 – 14 December 1945
 Tinker Air Force Base, Oklahoma, 27 June 1949 – 17 March 1951
 Bunker Hill Air Force Base, Indiana, 8 August 1955 – 1 September 1957
 Mather Air Force Base, California, 1 April 1973 – 31 May 1993
 Lackland Air Force Base, Texas

Aircraft
 Martin B-26 Marauder 1942–1945
 North American F-86 Sabre 1956
 Douglas B-26 Invader, 1949–1951
 North American T-6 Texan, by 1949–1951
 Beechcraft T-7 Navigator, 1950–1951
 Beechcraft T-11 Kansan, by 1949–1951
 North American F-100 Super Sabre 1956–1957
 Convair T-29 1973–1975
 Boeing T-43 1975–1993

References

Notes
 Explanatory notes

 Citations

Bibliography

 
 
 
 
 
 
 
 
 

453